The Bern University of Applied Sciences (BUAS, German: Berner Fachhochschule BFH, French: Haute école spécialisée bernoise HESB) is a public vocational university with a strong national and international profile.  It comprises six departments and also incorporates the Higher Technical School of Wood, which is affiliated to the Department of Architecture, Wood and Civil Engineering.

Locations
BFH is currently spread across 26 locations in Bern, Biel, Burgdorf, Magglingen and Zollikofen. In 2012, the Grand Council of the Canton of Bern decided to bring together the Department of Architecture, Wood and Civil Engineering and the Department of Engineering and Information Technology onto a single campus in Biel. The launch of the Biel/Bienne campus is scheduled for autumn 2023. The Health Professions, Social Work and Business departments and Bern University of the Arts will likely move to a shared campus in Bern in autumn 2026.

Departments
The Departments of the Bern University of Applied Sciences include:
 Architecture, Wood and Civil Engineering
 Health Professions
 Business
 School of Agricultural, Forest and Food Sciences HAFL
 Bern University of the Arts
 Social Work
 Engineering and Information Technology
 Swiss Federal Institute of Sport Magglingen SFISM

As well as Bachelor and master's degree programmes, BFH offers continuing education, applied research and development and other services.

The sports, agriculture, forest science, automotive engineering, nutrition and dietetics, literary writing and medical informatics degree programmes are unique in German-speaking Switzerland or throughout the whole of Switzerland.

Growth 
The following table shows how student numbers at the Bern University of Applied Sciences have grown since the university was founded in 1997.

1 Figures as of 31 December
2 Degree programmes prior to the Bologna Reform (which introduced Bachelor/Master's degree programmes)
3 Only MAS/EMBA students (not including CAS/DAS students). From 2014 onwards, non-matriculated MAS/EMBA students are also included in the statistics for BFH's areas of activity.

See also
 List of largest universities by enrollment in Switzerland

Notes and references

External links
 Bern University of Applied Sciences website

Bern University of Applied Sciences
Schools in Bern
Educational institutions established in 1997
1997 establishments in Switzerland